Kadthal is a village in Ranga Reddy district of the Indian state of Telangana. It is located in Kadthal mandal of Kandukur revenue division. Kadthal has emerged as a vibrant town along the Hyderabad Srisailam highway.

Maheswara Maha Pyramid, Kadthal Main Rd and Maisigandi Maisamma Temple, Kadthal are popular attractions located close to Kadthal town.

The upcoming Hyderabad Pharma City is in close proximity to the Kadthal town.

The villages in Kadthal mandal include:

1. Chellampally (Takuraju Guda, Vampu Guda, Jonnala Rasi, Balaji Nagar)
2. Maisigandi
3. Salarpoor
4. Maktta Madaram
5. Karkalpahad
6. Govinda Pally
7. Vasdevupur
8. Raviched

References 

Villages in Ranga Reddy district